Jiří Štancl (born 18 November 1949 in Prague, Czechoslovakia) is a former international speedway rider.

Career
Štancl reached the final of the Speedway World Championship on nine occasions between 1971 and 1984, finishing a career best 9th in 1982 in Los Angeles.

He won the Czechoslovakian National Championship twelve times, has appeared in the World Team Cup finals on seven occasions and in the Speedway World Pairs Championship finals seven times.

Štancl won the famed Golden Helmet of Pardubice in 1974, 1976, 1978, 1981 and 1982.

His son, George, is also a rider.

World Final Appearances

Individual World Championship
 1971 -  Gothenburg, Ullevi - 13th - 3pts
 1976 -  Chorzów, Silesian Stadium - 10th - 6pts
 1977 -  Gothenburg, Ullevi - 14th - 3pts
 1978 -  London, Wembley Stadium - 15th - 2pts
 1980 -  Gothenburg, Ullevi - 13th - 5pts
 1981 -  London, Wembley Stadium - 16th - 3pts
 1982 -  Los Angeles Memorial Coliseum - 9th - 7pts
 1983 -  Norden, Motodrom Halbemond - 16th - 1pt
 1984 -  Gothenburg, Ullevi - 16th - 1pt

World Pairs Championship
 1970 -  Malmö, Malmö Stadion (with Václav Verner) - 5th - 11pts (6)
 1972 -  Borås  (with Jan Holub I) - 6th - 12pts (7)
 1973 -  Borås  (with Petr Ondrašík) - 6th - 11pts (9)
 1977 -  Manchester, Hyde Road (with Jan Verner) - 4th - 17pts (11)
 1978 -  Chorzów, Silesian Stadium (with Jan Verner) - 4th - 18pts (9)
 1982 -  Sydney, Liverpool City Raceway (with Aleš Dryml) - 7th - 8pts (5)
 1984 -  Lonigo, Pista Speedway (with Aleš Dryml) - 6th - 10pts (5)

World Team Cup
 1970 -  London, Wembley Stadium (with Zdeněk Majstr / Václav Verner / Miloslav Verner / Jan Holub) - 4th - 3pts (0)
 1977 -  Wrocław, Olympic Stadium (with Václav Verner / Jan Verner / Aleš Dryml) - 3rd - 23pts (8)
 1978 -  Landshut, Ellermühle Stadium (with Václav Verner / Jan Verner / Aleš Dryml) - 4th - 16+2pts (7+2)
 1979 -  London, White City Stadium (with Zdeněk Kudrna / Aleš Dryml / Václav Verner ) - 3rd - 19pts (6)
 1980 -  Wrocław, Olympic Stadium (with Zdeněk Kudrna / Aleš Dryml / Václav Verner / Petr Ondrašík) - 4th - 12pts (4)
 1982 -  London, White City Stadium (with Aleš Dryml / Václav Verner / Petr Ondrašík / Antonín Kasper Jr.) - 4th - 17pts (4)
 1983 -  Vojens, Speedway Center (with Aleš Dryml / Václav Verner / Antonín Kasper Jr. / Petr Ondrašík) - 4th - 3pts (2)

References 

1949 births
Living people
Czechoslovak speedway riders
Coventry Bees riders
Reading Racers riders
Sportspeople from Prague